Diseröd is a locality situated in Kungälv Municipality, Västra Götaland County, Sweden. It had 1,241 inhabitants in 2010.

References 

Populated places in Västra Götaland County
Populated places in Kungälv Municipality